Tripoli Municipal Stadium is a 10,000 capacity multi-use stadium in Tripoli, Lebanon. It is located near the city center.

The stadium was inaugurated on 29 May 1960. It was recently rehabilitated to welcome Pan Arabic competitions, as well as Asian and International ones. It is also the home ground of AC Tripoli.

References 

Sports venues in Lebanon
Football venues in Lebanon